Edwards is an unincorporated community in southeastern Benton County, Missouri, United States.

History
A post office was established at Edwards in 1883. The community has the name of a local landowner.

Education
Warsaw R-IX School District operates South Elementary School at Edwards.

References

Unincorporated communities in Benton County, Missouri
Unincorporated communities in Missouri